List of Orthodox yeshivot in South Africa:

 Kollel Bet Mordechai
 Kollel Yad Shaul
 Lubavitch Yeshiva Gedolah of Johannesburg
 Ohr Somayach, South Africa
 Rabbinical College of Pretoria
 Yeshiva of Cape Town
 Yeshivah Gedolah of Johannesburg
 Yeshiva Maharsha Beis Aharon
 Yeshiva Pri Eitz Chaim
 Yeshivas Meshech Chochma

See also
Jewish education in South Africa
List of Jewish communities in South Africa

 
Judaism-related lists